Batavia Stad Fashion Outlet is a factory outlet center located in Lelystad, Netherlands.

It was the first fashion outlet center in the Netherlands.

The outlet is named after the ship Batavia from 1628.

References

Outlet malls
Lelystad
Retailing in Europe